Benjamin Chase Pittman (born March 12, 1983) is a former American football defensive end who is currently the defensive line coach at Calvary Baptist Academy in Shreveport, Louisiana. He was drafted by the Cleveland Browns in the seventh round of the 2007 NFL draft. He played college football at Louisiana State University and Texas.

Early years
A native of Minden, Louisiana in Webster Parish, Pittman attended Evangel Christian Academy, where as a senior made sixty-three tackles and six sacks.

College career
Pittman played college football for the LSU Tigers. He played in 25 games and made 61 tackles and 8.5 sacks. He had originally attended the University of Texas at Austin before transferring to LSU in 2004. He majored in general studies.

Professional career

Cleveland Browns
Pittman was selected by the Cleveland Browns in the seventh round (213th overall) in the 2007 NFL Draft. He was waived/injured on August 30, 2008.

References

External links
 Cleveland Browns profile

1983 births
Living people
American football defensive ends
American football defensive tackles
Cleveland Browns players
LSU Tigers football players
High school football coaches in Louisiana
Sportspeople from Minden, Louisiana
Players of American football from Shreveport, Louisiana